Abd Al Salam Al Masawi (Arabic: عبد السلام المساوي) is a Moroccan poet and writer. He was born in Morocco. He is currently the head of the Regional Center for Documentation, Revitalization and Production at the Fez Academy. He won many awards, including the Baland Al-Haidari Award (Asilah Forum) for his book “The Ceilings of Al-Majaz” 2000.

Biography 
The Moroccan writer and poet Abdel Salam El Massaoui was born in 1958 in Bayla, Zaher Souk (Taounate Province), Morocco. He won many awards, including the Baland Al-Haidari Prize (Asilah Forum) for his book “The Ceilings of Al-Majaz” 2000. He holds a state doctorate in contemporary Arabic literature and previously held the position of head of the Regional Center for Documentation, Revitalization and Production at the Academy of Fez. He continued his postgraduate studies at the Faculty of Letters and Human Sciences in Fez.

He obtained a BA in Arabic literature in 1982, a certificate of in-depth studies in 1985, and a postgraduate diploma in 1992. He works as a professor of higher education at the Teacher Training Center in Fez. His publications began in 1983 with the appearance of his poem "No Love on Borders" in the Socialist Union newspaper. He joined the Union of Moroccan Writers on June 13, 1991. His production ranges between poetic writing, narrative and literary criticism. He published his works in a number of newspapers and magazines: Al-Alam, Cultural Anwal, Anwal, Socialist Union, Literary Week (Syria), Damascene Culture (Syria), Afaq, Raseef, The Seventh Day, Witness (Cyprus) Knowledge (Syria), Al-Fursan (Paris). Among his publications are "The Snatcher Birds" (poetry), and "This is what Poetry gave me" (poetry), "The Significant Structures in Amal Dunqul's Poetry", and "Colored Rhythms - Readings in Contemporary Moroccan Poetry".

Works 

 A letter to my village: poetry. Casablanca, Nashra Foundation for Printing and Publishing, 1986. p. 72
 The Significant Structures in the Poetry of Amal Dunqul. Publications of the Arab Writers Union, Damascus, 1994.
 The ceilings of metaphor. Moroccan publishing house, Casablanca, 1999.
 Spiders from the Blood of Place. Postmodern House 2003
 Sniffer birds. With the support of the Ministry of Culture, 2006
 The Aesthetics of Death in Mahmoud Darwish's Poetry. Dar Al-Saqi 2008
 This is what poetry gave me. Infoprint House 2008
 Military melody for a sentimental song. Dar Al-Nahda 2011
 The imagined death in the poetry of Adonis. Dar Al-Naya 2013
 Wide Interpretation. House of Poetry in Morocco 2015

Prizes 

 Baland Al-Haidari Award (Asilah Forum) for his book "The Ceilings of Al-Majaz" 2000.

References 

Moroccan poets
Moroccan male poets
1958 births
Living people